The 2010 Lafayette Leopards football team represented Lafayette College in the 2010 NCAA Division I FCS football season. The team was led by Frank Tavani, in his 11th season as head coach. The Leopards played their home games at Fisher Stadium in Easton, Pennsylvania.

After being ranked in the Sports Network and Coaches Top 25 poll in each of the past six season, the Leopards finished an uncharacteristic 2–9 overall and 1–5 in the Patriot League. The Leopards lost to Georgetown in their opening game for the first time since 2003 and lost their third consecutive game against arch-rival Lehigh University in the 146th meeting of The Rivalry.

Schedule

References

Lafayette
Lafayette Leopards football seasons
Lafayette Leopards football